The 2016 Texas Tech Red Raiders football team represented Texas Tech University in the 2016 NCAA Division I FBS football season as members of the Big 12 Conference. Kliff Kingsbury led the Red Raiders in his fourth season as the program's fifteenth head coach. The Red Raiders played their home games on the university's campus in Lubbock, Texas at Jones AT&T Stadium. They finished the season 5–7, 3–6 in Big 12 play.

Previous season
The 2015 Texas Tech Red Raiders football team finished the regular season 7–5, 4–5 in Big 12 play to finish in sixth place. Their four conference wins were against Iowa State, Kansas, Kansas State, and Texas.

Schedule
Texas Tech announced their 2016 football schedule on November 24, 2015. The 2016 schedule consisted of 6 home games, 5 away games and, 1 neutral site game in the regular season. The Red Raiders hosted Big 12 foes Kansas, West Virginia, Oklahoma, and Texas and traveled to Kansas State, TCU, Oklahoma State, and Iowa State. Texas Tech played Baylor in Arlington, Texas at AT&T Stadium for the 75th meeting in their rivalry.

The Red Raiders hosted two non-conference games against Stephen F. Austin and Louisiana Tech and traveled to their other non-conference foe Arizona State in Tempe, AZ.

Schedule Source:

Roster

Season summary

Stephen F. Austin

The Red Raiders opened their 2016 season at home against the Stephen F. Austin Lumberjacks. Texas Tech's defense looked very improved compared to the previous two seasons, holding the Lumberjacks to only 370 total yards (with just 58 rushing yards), 24 first downs, and forcing 3 turnovers. With the win, the Red Raiders started a season 1-0 for the 12th year in a row.

Arizona State

Texas Tech's defense fell apart against Arizona State, allowing the Sun Devils' Kalen Ballage to score 8 touchdowns (7 rushing, 1 receiving), tied for the NCAA record for most touchdowns in a game by a single player.

Louisiana Tech

Teas Tech completely dominated in the first quarter, with the offense scoring a touchdown on all of their drives and the defense holding Louisiana Tech to only a field goal. Fortune started to smile upon the Bulldogs late in the 2nd quarter, with Clayton Hatfield missing a 40-yard field goal with 2:18 left in the half. Following Hatfield's missed kick, Louisiana Tech went 78 yards to score a touchdown on Jarred Craft's 1 yard run. Gaining the ball back with 0:09 seconds left in the half, the Red Raiders took a knee to lead 35–17 at halftime.

The momentum continued for Louisiana Tech into the 3rd quarter, with the Bulldogs scoring on their opening possession of the half. The Red Raiders responded on their next drive with Patrick Mahomes finding Cameron Batson for a 4-yard touchdown pass. With Clayton Hatfield making the extra point, Texas Tech extended their lead to 42–24. Louisiana Tech quickly responded on their next possession with Ryan Higgins throwing a 54-yard touchdown pass to Carlos Henderson, Higgins's first touchdown pass of the night. The Red Raiders responded slowly on their next drive and suffered from several offensive holding penalties. The drive was capped off early in the 4th quarter with Demarcus Felton's 8 yard run for a touchdown. With Hatfield making the extra point, Texas Tech extended their lead to 49–31 with 14:21 left to play. Louisiana Tech came up short on the next drive, with the Bulldogs turning it over on downs, which eventually resulted in a 24-yard field goal from Hatfield. Louisiana Tech quickly scored on their next drive with Higgins finding Trent Taylor for a 76-yard touchdown reception. On the ensuing kickoff, the Bulldogs tried for an onside kick that was recovered by the Red Raiders. Louisiana Tech's Jordan Bradford was ejected late in the game for throwing a punch following Texas Tech's eighth touchdown of the game.

Kansas

The Texas Tech Red Raiders opened conference play at home against the Kansas Jayhawks. Texas Tech starting quarterback Patrick Mahomes was injured midway through the third quarter with Nic Shimonek coming in as quarterback. Schimonek almost matched Mahomes's efficiency, throwing 15–of–21 for 271 yards and four touchdowns. The Red Raiders' offense scored 8 touchdowns in the game, with two different quarterbacks and six different receivers.

Kansas State

Despite leaving last week's game with a shoulder injury, Patrick Mahomes started as quarterback for the Red Raiders. Texas Tech had several miscues during the first half as a Mahomes pass was intercepted by D. J. Reed and returned 35 yards for a pick six touchdown. Later in the second quarter, Kansas State's Byron Pringle returned a kickoff 99 yards for a touchdown to give the Wildcats a 31–28 lead going into the half. Both teams slowed down in the third quarter, with the only score of the quarter coming from a 34-yard Clayton Hatfield field goal to tie the game 31–31. Kansas State opened the game up during the fourth, leading 44–31 with just under 2 minutes to go. Despite trailing by 13 with little time left, the Red Raiders refused to give up. Texas Tech scored a touchdown with 5 seconds left and trailed 38–44. The Red Raiders recovered an onside kick with the hope of a comeback still alive, but Mahomes was sacked on the next play to end the game.

West Virginia

Oklahoma

The Red Raiders and Sooners broke the NCAA record for combined offensive yards in a single game with a total of 1,708 yards, with each team having 854 yards. Texas Tech quarterback Patrick Mahomes tied the record for most passing yards in a single game with 734 yards, while the combined 125 points is the second most points in a game involving a ranked team.

TCU

Texas Tech came into Amon G. Carter Stadium looking to break a 3-game losing streak on the season. The Red Raiders received the opening kickoff, but came up short when a pass by Patrick Mahomes was intercepted by Nick Orr at the TCU 1 yard line. The Horned Frogs capitalized on the turnover with a 2-yard touchdown run from Derrick Green. With Brandon Hatfield making the extra point, TCU led 7–0 with 4:40 in the 1st quarter. Tech's offensive struggles continued on their next possession when Mahomes was sacked at and fumbled the ball at the Texas Tech 23 yard line. The Red Raiders caught a break when TCU kicker Brandon Hatfield missed a 37-yard field goal.

Tech took advantage of the missed field goal by scoring a touchdown on the following possession with Mahomes finding Reggie Davis for a 33-yard touchdown pass. With Clayton Hatfield making the kick, the Red Raiders tied the game at 7–7 with 13:23 left in the 2nd quarter. The Horned Frogs responded to Tech's touchdown on their next possession with a 23-yard field goal from Brandon Hatfield to lead 10–7. The Red Raiders responded on their next possession with a 41-yard field goal to tie the game 10–10 with 6:49 left in the half. The two teams traded punts before the first half ended with a 10–10 tie.

TCU quarterback Kenny Hill threw an interception on the Horned Frogs' second possession of the half and was pulled from the game in favor of Foster Sawyer. TCU's defense forced a three and out after the interception and Texas Tech was forced to put, but on the ensuing punt, punter Michael Barden fumbled the ball and TCU recovered it at their own 15 yard line. The Horned Frogs capitalized on the fumble with a 1-yard touchdown run from Trevorris Johnson. With Brandon Hatfield making the extra point, TCU took a 17–10 lead with 14:37 left in regulation following a scoreless third quarter. Texas Tech was forced to punt on their next possession and TCU made it to the Texas Tech 15 and was forced to try a field goal, but Brandon Hatfield missed the 32 yard try. Like before, the Red Raiders scored a touchdown following the Horned Frogs' missed field goal. With 1:28 left in regulation, Mahomes found Dylan Cantrell for an 8-yard touchdown pass and Clayton Hatfield made the extra point to tie the game 17–17. On the final play of regulation, TCU tried a game–winning Hail Mary pass, but it fell incomplete.

The Red Raiders received the ball first in overtime and scored on a 15-yard touchdown run from Mahomes. With Clayton Hatfield making the extra point, Texas Tech led 24–17, their first lead of the game. TCU responded on their try with a 25-yard touchdown pass from Foster Sawyer to Desmon White. With Brandon Hatfield making the extra point, the game entered into 2nd overtime tied at 24–24. The Horned Frogs had the ball first in 2nd overtime, but Brandon Hatfield missed a 39-yard field goal that fell short and was nowhere close to the goal posts. Receiving the ball, the Red Raiders played conservatively and only gained 5 yards before Clayton Hatfield was brought on to try the game-winning field goal. Clayton Hatfield made a 37-yard field goal to upset TCU with a 27–24 victory in double overtime.

TCU's kicker Brandon Hatfield was 1/4 on field goals during the game, while the Texas Tech offense was held to a season low 345 yards.

Texas

Oklahoma State

Despite suffering numerous injuries throughout the game on both offense and defense, the Red Raiders refused to go without a fight against the Cowboys. With 1:44 left in the game, Texas Tech fullback Quinton White, who was in the game as a running back, found the endzone on a 1-yard touchdown run, but Clayton Hatfield missed the game-tying extra point. With Hatfield missing the extra point, Texas Tech fell to Oklahoma State 44–45.

Iowa State

Baylor

Statistics

Scoring
Scores against all opponents

Scores against the Big 12

Offense

Special teams

Weekly awards
 Big 12 Offensive Player of the Week
Patrick Mahomes (week 2 vs. Arizona State)
Patrick Mahomes* (week 8 vs. Oklahoma)

• *co-offensive player of the week

References

Texas Tech
Texas Tech Red Raiders football seasons
Texas Tech Red Raiders football